Corwin is a hamlet  in the town of Newfane in Niagara County, New York, United States.

References

Hamlets in New York (state)
Hamlets in Niagara County, New York